This is a list of notable restaurants in Tokyo, Japan.

Restaurants in Tokyo

 Afuri
 The Amrita – Japan's first naked restaurant
 L'Atelier de Joël Robuchon – Michelin 2-star French restaurant located in Minato, Tokyo
 Butlers Café – restaurant and bar located in Shibuya, Tokyo, one of Japan's leading fashion centers
 Les Créations de Narisawa – received one Michelin star in the 2008 Michelin Guide Tokyo, and then two stars in 2010
 Grand Central Oyster Bar & Restaurant – has two locations in Tokyo
 Matsugen – name of several Japanese restaurants owned by the Matsushita brothers located in Tokyo, Hawaii, and New York City
 Nihonryori Ryugin – fusion cuisine restaurant in Minato-ku, Tokyo
 L'Osier – Michelin Guide former 3-star (2008-2011) classic French cuisine restaurant in Chuo-ku, Tokyo
 Ramen Street – area in the underground mall of the Tokyo Station railway station's Yaesu side that has eight restaurants specializing in ramen dishes.
 Ribera Steakhouse – Japanese professional wrestling, boxing and mixed martial arts-themed steak house restaurant with two locations in Tokyo
 Tokyo Skytree – Sky Restaurant 634 is located here

Michelin 3-starred restaurants 
The Michelin Guide for Tokyo was started in 2008.

See also
 Lists of restaurants

References

External links
 

 
Tokyo